The Immaculate Heart of Mary School is a historic school building on the campus of the Immaculate Heart of Mary Church in northern Pulaski County, Arkansas.  It is located off Arkansas Highway 365, north of North Little Rock and east of Marche.  The building is a single-story wood-frame building with Craftsman styling.  It has a gable-on-hip roof with a front porch supported by square brick columns, with false timbering applied over vertical boards in the gable end.  The building was built in 1925 by the church's head carpenter, George Makowski.

The building was listed on the National Register of Historic Places in 1993 for its architectural significance.

See also
National Register of Historic Places listings in Pulaski County, Arkansas

References

School buildings on the National Register of Historic Places in Arkansas
School buildings completed in 1925
Buildings and structures in Pulaski County, Arkansas
National Register of Historic Places in Pulaski County, Arkansas
1925 establishments in Arkansas